Christian Springer (born 15 July 1971) is a German former professional footballer who played as a midfielder.

References

1971 births
Living people
Association football midfielders
German footballers
Bundesliga players
2. Bundesliga players
FC St. Pauli players
1. FC Köln players
People from Forchheim
Sportspeople from Upper Franconia
Footballers from Bavaria